Thaumatodracon is a genus of rhomaleosaurid pliosaur from the early Jurassic found in the United Kingdom. It contains a single species, named by Adam Smith and Ricardo Araújo in 2017.

References

Rhomaleosaurids
Fossil taxa described in 2017
Sauropterygian genera